Phyciodes graphica, the vesta crescent, is a species of crescents, checkerspots, anglewings, etc. in the butterfly family Nymphalidae.

The MONA or Hodges number for Phyciodes graphica is 4479.1.

References

Further reading

External links

 

Melitaeini
Articles created by Qbugbot
Butterflies described in 1869
Butterflies of North America
Taxa named by Rudolf Felder